Aung Yay Chan (born 7 July 1992) is a Burmese television and film actor. He is  best known for his roles in television series Pyar Yay Aine (2017), I'm Mahaythi (2018), Sue Pann Khwai Thwe Bayet Hnint Pay Ywat Leik Nahtaung Sin (2020) and Legends of Warriors (2020).

Early life and education
He was born in Yangon, Myanmar on 7 July 1992. He is youngest brother of three. He attended high school at BEHS 1 Insein.

Career
In 2010, the first step in the role of Aung Yay Chan was to play a role in the Roleplaying. After that, he participated in a photogenic competition organized by Forever Group.  While competing in the competition, MRTV-4 Talent was selected for the new cast. In 2014, he starred in his first MRTV-4 drama series Forever Mandalay alongside Aung Min Khant, Chue Lay and Myat Thu Thu.

In 2015, he starred in thriller drama series Winkabar San Eain alongside Aung Min Khant, Poe Kyar Phyu Khin, Hsaung Wutyee May and Myat Thu Thu. In the same year, he starred in thriller drama series Sone See Chin Moe Tain Myar.

In 2016, he starred in drama series Better Tomorrow alongside Aung Min Khant, Nat Khat and Chue Lay. In 2017, he then took the leading role in drama series Pyar Yay Aine as the character Ko Tin Phay. 

In 2018, he starred in drama series Yatha Mawkun Alinkar. In the same year, he starred the main role Min Myo Nwe, in drama series I'm Mahaythi alongside Wint Yamone Naing and Than Thar Moe Theint. 

In 2020, he starred in drama series Sue Pann Khwai Thwe Bayet Hnint Pay Ywat Leik Nahtaung Sin as the character Myo Thwin alongside Khant Sithu and Khine Thin Kyi. In the same year, he starred in military series Legends of Warriors alongside Kyaw Hsu and May Myint Mo.

Filmography

Film (Cinema)
 Yoma Paw Kya Tae Myet Yay  (2019)
 8 Seconds Silence (2020)

Film
 Mhone  (2014)
 A Phyu Yaung Thet Tant  (2014)

Television series
 Forever Mandalay  (2014)
 Better Tomorrow  (2016)
 Winkabar San Eain  (2015)
 Sone See Chin Moe Tain Myar  (2015)
 Pyar Yay Aine  (2017)
 Yatha Mawkun Alinkar  (2018)
 I'm Mahaythi  (2018)
 Sue Pann Khwai Thwe Bayet Hnint Pay Ywat Leik Nahtaung Sin  (2020)
 Legends of Warriors  (2020)
 Mahuyar Pearl''  (2023)

References

External links

Living people
1992 births
Burmese male models
Burmese male film actors
21st-century Burmese male actors
People from Yangon